World mix is a re-release version of the Deep Forest eponymous album, originally released in 1992. The record was released by Columbia Records on 13 April 1994.

Track listing 
 "Deep Forest" – 5:34
 "Sweet Lullaby" – 3:54
 "Hunting" – 3:27
 "Night Bird" – 4:18
 "The First Twilight" – 3:18
 "Savana Dance" – 4:26
 "Desert Walk" – 5:14
 "White Whisper" – 5:46
 "The Second Twilight" – 3:02 (Original Deep Forest 1992 release length is 1:24)
 "Sweet Lullaby (Ambient Mix)" – 3:44
 "Sweet Lullaby (Round The World Mix)" – 6:48
 "Sweet Lullaby (Apollo Mix)" – 7:20
 "Deep Forest (Sunrise At Alcatraz)" – 7:07
 "Forest Hymn (Apollo Mix)" – 6:46
 "Forest Hymn" – 5:49 (Originally issued as a bonus track on the 1992 Japanese release)

Credits
Eric Mouquet – Arrangement, Keyboards, Programming
Michel Sanchez – Idea, Arrangement, Keyboards, Programming
Michel Villain – Add. Vocals
Cooky Cue – Keyboards, Programming on [6], Engineer
Dan Lacksman – Producer, Engineer, Mixing
Guilain Joncheray – Executive Producer
Pete Arden – Re-Mixing on [11]
Jose Reynoso – Engineer on [11]
Apollo 440 – Re-Mix, Add. Production on [12], [14]
Mark Spoon – Re-Mix, Add. Production on [13]
Daniel Iriibaren – Re-Mix, Add. Production on [13]

Reception

Charts

Certifications

References

External links
 Details, samples and lyrics with translations from Deep Forest

Deep Forest albums
1994 albums
Columbia Records albums